1948 in sports describes the year's events in world sport.

American football
 NFL Championship: the Philadelphia Eagles won 7–0 over the Chicago Cardinals at Shibe Park in a blizzard
 Michigan Wolverines – college football national championship
 Cleveland Browns defeated the Buffalo Bills 49–7 in the All-America Football Conference championship game.

Association football

Egypt
 Egyptian Premier League founded.

England
 First Division – Arsenal win the 1947–48 title.
 FA Cup – Manchester United beat Blackpool 4–2.

Athletics

33 athletics events were contested at the Olympic Games in London, including debuts for the men's 10 km walk; and the women's 200 metres, long jump and shot put. Fanny Blankers-Koen of the Netherlands captured four gold medals.

Australian rules football
Victorian Football League
 Melbourne wins the 52nd VFL Premiership, drawing the 1948 VFL Grand Final with Essendon 10.9 (69) to 7.27 (69), and winning the replay 13.11 (89) to Essendon's 7.8 (50)
 Brownlow Medal awarded to Bill Morris (Richmond)
South Australian National Football League
 2 October – Norwood wins its twenty-first SANFL premiership, defeating West Torrens 15.16 (106) to 7.7 (49)
 Magarey Medal awarded to Ron Phillips (North Adelaide)
Western Australian National Football League
 9 October – South Fremantle wins its fourth premiership and second in succession, defeating West Perth 13.9 (87) to 9.9 (63)
 Sandover Medal awarded to Merv McIntosh (Perth)

Baseball
 January 29 – Commissioner Happy Chandler fines the Yankees, Cubs, and Phillies $500 each for signing high school players.
 February 27 – Hall of Fame election – voters select the recently deceased Herb Pennock, and Pie Traynor, as the newest inductees; Traynor is the first third baseman elected by the writers in 9 elections.
 August 16 – death of Babe Ruth
 World Series – Cleveland Indians defeat Boston Braves, 4 games to 2.
 Negro World Series – Homestead Grays defeat the Birmingham Black Barons, 4 games to 1.
 College World Series - University of Southern California defeat Yale in the 2nd  2 games to 1

Basketball
NCAA Basketball Championship

Kentucky beat Baylor 58–42

BAA (NBA) Finals

Baltimore Bullets win four games to two over the Philadelphia Warriors

NBL Championship

Minneapolis Lakers win three games to one over the Rochester Royals

Boxing
 June 25 – At New York's Yankee Stadium – Joe Louis knocked out Jersey Joe Walcott in the 11th round to retain his heavyweight title for the 25th time. Shortly after the bout, Louis announced his retirement from boxing.

Field hockey
 Olympic Games (men's competition) in London, Great Britain
 Gold: India
 Silver: Great Britain
 Bronze: Netherlands

Figure skating
 World Figure Skating Championships
 Men's champion: Dick Button, United States
 Ladies' champion: Barbara Ann Scott, Canada
 Pair skating champions: Micheline Lannoy & Pierre Baugniet, Belgium

Golf
Men's professional
 Masters Tournament – Claude Harmon
 PGA Championship – Ben Hogan
 U.S. Open – Ben Hogan
 British Open – Henry Cotton
Men's amateur
 British Amateur – Frank Stranahan
 U.S. Amateur – Willie Turnesa
Women's professional
 Women's Western Open – Patty Berg
 U.S. Women's Open – Babe Zaharias
 Titleholders Championship – Patty Berg

Ice hockey
 NCAA Men's Ice Hockey Championship – Michigan Wolverines defeat Dartmouth College Big Green 8–4 in Colorado Springs, Colorado to win the first official NCAA championship
 Stanley Cup – Toronto Maple Leafs beat Detroit Red Wings in 4 straight games to win their 5th Stanley Cup title.

Horse racing
 Citation becomes the 8th horse to win the US Triple Crown
 Shiela's Cottage becomes the first mare to win the Grand National since 1902 and only the twelfth since the race's inception
Steeplechases
 Cheltenham Gold Cup – Cottage Rake
 Grand National – Sheila's Cottage
Hurdle races
 Champion Hurdle – National Spirit
Flat races
 Australia – Melbourne Cup won by Rimfire (horse)
 Canada – King's Plate won by Last Mark
 France – Prix de l'Arc de Triomphe won by Migoli
 Ireland – Irish Derby Stakes won by Nathoo
 English Triple Crown Races:
 2,000 Guineas Stakes – My Babu
 The Derby – My Love
 St. Leger Stakes – Black Tarquin
 United States Triple Crown Races:
 Kentucky Derby – Citation
 Preakness Stakes – Citation
 Belmont Stakes – Citation

Motorsport

Olympic Games
 1948 Summer Olympics takes place in London, United Kingdom
 United States wins the most medals (84) and the most gold medals (38).
 1948 Winter Olympics takes place in St. Moritz, Switzerland
 Norway, Sweden and Switzerland all win the most medals (10 each), and Norway and Sweden win the most gold medals (4 each).

Radiosport
 First CQ World Wide DX Contest held in October and November.  This annual event would go on to become the radio contest with the largest participation worldwide.

Rowing
The Boat Race
 27 March — Cambridge wins the 94th Oxford and Cambridge Boat Race

Rugby league
Australia
1948 NSWRFL season

England
1947–48 Northern Rugby Football League season/1948–49 Northern Rugby Football League season

Rugby union
Five Nations Championship
 54th Five Nations Championship series is won by Ireland who complete the Grand Slam, their last for 61 years.

Snooker
 World Snooker Championship – Fred Davis beats Walter Donaldson 84–61.

Speed skating
Speed Skating World Championships
 Men's All-round Champion – Odd Lundberg (Norway)
 Women's All-round Champion – Maria Isakova (USSR)
1948 Winter Olympics (Men)
 500m – gold medal: Finn Helgesen (Norway)
 1500m – gold medal: Sverre Farstad (Norway)
 5000m – gold medal: Reidar Liaklev (Norway)
 10000m – gold medal: Åke Seyffarth (Sweden)
1948 Winter Olympics (Women)
 not contested

Tennis
Australia
 Australian Men's Singles Championship – Adrian Quist (Australia) defeats John Bromwich (Australia) 6–4, 3–6, 6–3, 2–6, 6–3
 Australian Women's Singles Championship – Nancye Wynne Bolton (Australia) defeats Marie Toomey (Australia) 6–3, 6–1
England
 Wimbledon Men's Singles Championship – Bob Falkenburg (USA) defeats John Bromwich (Australia) 7–5, 0–6, 6–2, 3–6, 7–5
 Wimbledon Women's Singles Championship – Louise Brough Clapp (USA) defeats Doris Hart (USA) 6–3, 8–6
France
 French Men's Singles Championship – Frank Parker (USA) defeats Jaroslav Drobný (Egypt) 6–1, 6–2, 3–6, 5–7, 7–5
 French Women's Singles Championship – Nelly Adamson Landry (USA) defeats Shirley Fry (USA) 6–2, 0–6, 6–0
USA
 American Men's Singles Championship – Pancho Gonzales (USA) defeats Eric Sturgess (South Africa) 6–2, 6–3, 14–12
 American Women's Singles Championship – Margaret Osborne (USA) defeats Louise Brough (USA) 4–6, 6–4, 15–13
Davis Cup
 1948 Davis Cup –  5–0  at West Side Tennis Club (grass) New York City, United States

Awards
 Associated Press Male Athlete of the Year – Lou Boudreau, Major League Baseball
 Associated Press Female Athlete of the Year – Fanny Blankers-Koen, Track and field

References

 
Sports by year